The chief justice of the Leeward Islands headed the Supreme Court of the Leeward Islands.

The British Leeward Islands was a British colony existing between 1833 and 1960, and consisted of Antigua, Barbuda, the British Virgin Islands, Montserrat, Saint Kitts, Nevis, Anguilla and Dominica (to 1940). Prior to 1871, when the Supreme Court was established, the individual islands had their own courts.

In 1939 the Windward and Leeward Islands Supreme Court and the Windward and Leeward Islands Court of Appeal were established, which was replaced in 1967 by the Eastern Caribbean Supreme Court which provides both functions.

List of chief justices

Antigua
 1706– Samuel Watkins
 ?–1716 John Gamble
 1716–c.1742 Samuel Watkins
 ?–1750 William Lavington
 1750– William Blizard
 ?–1759 Richard Wilson
 1759–1762 Ralph Payne
 c.1776 Thomas Jarvis
 c.1792–1814 Rowland Burton
 1814–1822 James Athill
 1823–c.1833 Paul Daxon Horsford
 c.1844–1847 Richard Weston Nanton
 1847–1856 Robert Marsh Horsford
 1856–>1863 Sir William Snagg (Antigua and Montserrat) (afterwards Chief Justice of British Guiana, 1868)
 1863–1864 Richard Weston Mara (acting)

Dominica
 1767–1773 Thomas Atwood (afterwards Chief Justice of the Bahamas)
 1773 James Ashley Hall (died in office)
 1773–1779 Thomas Wilson
 1789–1805 John Matson
 1806 John Burrows
 1812–c.1825 Archibald Gloster
 1827–1828 John O'Driscoll
 1828–1833 Robert Sympson Jameson
 c.1844 Henry John Glanville
 1849–? Henry Isles Woodcock
 1856–1861 Alan Ker
 1861– Shalto Thomas Pemberton

Montserrat
 1804– M. Dyett
 c.1822–c.1825 Thomas Hill
 c.1833 Dudley Semper
 c.1842 John P. Trott
 c.1844 Samuel Lee Frith
 1844–1847 John Shiell
 1847–1856 Sir Robert Marsh Horsford
 1856– William Snagg (afterwards Chief Justice of British Guiana, 1868)

Nevis
 1731–1751 John Dasent
 1754– Joseph Herbert (died 1768)
 1781–1787 John Dasent
 1787– John Ward
 George Webb Daniell
 1810– James Weekes
 c.1822–1833 William Lawrence
 c.1844 George Webb
 1854–1856 Alan Ker
 1856 Aston Devoren

St Kitts
 c.1717 Clement Crooke
 ?–1727 John Greatheed
 1727–c.1730 Jeremiah Browne
 c.1730 William Pym Burt (died 1750)
 Jeremiah Browne (reinstated)
 1735– James Gordon
 ?–1759 Richard Wilson
 1759– Ralph Payne (died 1763)
 1766– Craister Greatheed (died 1780)
 1780–1800 William Payne Georges
 1804– William Woodley
 1808–1819 J. Garnett
 1820–1833 Robert Williams Pickwoad (Pickwood) (died 8 Feb 1834)
 c.1844 Joseph King Wattley, Snr
 1849–? Henry John Glanville
 ?–1856 Aston Devoren (afterwards Chief Justice of Nevis)
 1856 Archibald Paul Burt (temp)
 1857–1867 Henry James Ross
 1873–1874 Robert French Sheriff (acting)

British Leeward Islands
 1874–1875 Sir Julian Pauncefote
 1875–1877 Sir William Henry Doyle
 1878–1879 Sir George Campbell Anderson
 1879–1882 Sir Henry James Burford-Hancock
 1881–1883 Sir John Tankerville Goldney (acting)
 1883–1886 Sir John Gorrie (afterwards Chief Justice of Trinidad, 1886)
 1886–1891 Sir Henry Ludlow
 1891–1900 Sir Henry Wrenfordsley
 1900–1911 John Symonds Udal
 1912–1919 Sir Frederic Mackenzie Maxwell
 1919–1921 Sir Charles James Griffin
 1921–1922 Sir Alfred Karney Young
 1923–1924 Sir George Campbell Deane
 1925–1931 Sir Herbert Cecil Stronge
 1931–1937 Sir James Stanley Rae
 1937–1939 Sir Wilfred Murray Wigley

Windward and Leeward Islands
 1940–1943 James Henry Jarrett
 1943–1950 Sir Clement Malone
 1950–1957 Sir Donald Edward Jackson
 1958–1963 Sir Cyril George Xavier Henriques
 1963–?1967 Frank E. Field

References

Leeward Islands